George Theodore Braakman (1903 – 1965) was an American figure skater.  He competed as a singles skater and as a pair skater with Ada Bauman.

Results

Singles

Pairs
(with Bauman)

References
Brief profile of George Braakman

1903 births
1965 deaths
American male single skaters
American male pair skaters